Babruysk Railway Station is a railway station in Babruysk, Belarus.

History
The station was built by Karl Otto Georg von Meck as part of the third section of the Libau–Romny Railway constructed 1871–1874. The Misk-Babruysk section was completed onin September 1873, with the first locomotive arriving that November. Over the next few decades the facilities of the railway service was improved, with a station building being completed in 1900. In 1932 a new connection to Starushki was added.

Tsar Nicholas II visited Babruysk Station in December, 1904, where he reviewed the 1st Brigade of the 40th Infantry Division of the Imperial Russian Army, stationed at the nearby Babruysk fortress.

10 billion rubles was spent in the 2004 to 2005 period to renovate the station, including new lighting and provision of flowerbeds.

Gallery

References

External links

Railway stations in the Russian Empire opened in 1873
Railway stations in Belarus
Babruysk